Philip Herries Gregory  (24 July 1907, Exmouth, Devon, UK – 9 February 1986) was a British mycologist and phytopathologist. He established an international reputation as a pioneer of aerobiology and a leading expert on the liberation and dispersal of fungal spores and their relation to plant diseases and to human respiratory diseases. In 1957 he was elected to a one-year term as president of the British Mycological Society.

Biography
During childhood, as a result of severe asthma which prevented him from regular school attendance, Philip H. Gregory had an erratic early education. At age 14 his asthma moderated and he became an enthusiast of outdoor excursions, meteorology, and natural history.

Gregory graduated in 1928 from Brighton Technical College with a B.Sc. (General) degree in botany, chemistry, and zoology. Supported by a Royal Scholarship, he completed the final year of the B.Sc. (Special) degree course in botany at London's Imperial College of Science and Technology. There he did research in botany under the supervision of the plant pathologist William Brown and graduated with a Ph.D. on Fusarium disease in the genus Narcissus. and a D.I.C. 

In 1931 George Herbert Pethybridge (1871–1948), a Ph.D. examiner for Gregory, recommended him to Arthur Henry Reginald Buller. The outstanding mycologist Buller had a remarkable research team and was searching for a medical mycologist to work with Andrew M. Davidson, a dermatologist and lecturer at the University of Manitoba in Winnipeg, Manitoba, Canada. Gregory worked with Davidson in Winnipeg for about 3 years from the end of 1931 to the end of 1934 and they coauthored several papers. In 1932 in Winnipeg, Gregory married Margaret F. Culverhouse — they became engaged three years earlier in London. 

In early 1935 Philip and Margaret Gregory returned to England.
From 1935 to 1940 Gregory did research on flower bulb diseases of Narcissus and other species at Seale-Hayne College (an agricultural college near Newton Abbey). From 1935 to 1939 he did all of his fieldwork west of Truro and mostly in the Isles of Scilly.

From 1940 to 1953 he was employed at the Rothamsted Experimental Station (now called Rothamsted Research) and worked on potato leafroll virus (PLRV) and potato virus Y (PVY). His research team established that aphids spread viral diseases of potato. During WW II he served as an air raid warden and during nights on duty he read scientific literature relevant to his research. Gregory thereupon learned Russian from phonograph records which he purchased with money received from selling his grandfather's gold watch. With help from his wife Margaret, he published in 1945 an important formula, which became a classic. (The formula was subsequently extended by A. C. Chamberlain.) Gregory became interested in the production of penicillin by Penicillium chrysogenum Thom (then known as P. notatum Westling) and took a one-year secondment to work at Imperial Chemical Industries, Ltd., Biological Laboratories, Manchester. In 1948 Gregory published a multiple infection transformation, which is now often used. In 1951 Gregory, in collaboration with S. Waller, introduced the genus Cryptostroma.

In 1953 Gregory resigned his position as assistant director of Rothamsted's plant pathology laboratory to become a professor in the chair of botany at Imperial College London. He conducted his research at the Chelsea Physic Garden.

In 1958 Gregory returned to Rothamsted as head of the plant pathology department. For some years he collaborated with Professor Jack Pepys, M.D. at the Institute of Diseases of the Chest (now the National Heart and Lung Institute). In 1967 Gregory retired, suffering from health problems. After a brief stay in hospital, his health improved and he became an international consultant on diseases of Theobroma cocoa.

Gregory's research on spore dispersal and disease gradients, along with the work of J. E. Van Der Plank Jr., provided the theoretical basis for much research on phytopathological epidemiology and forecasting, as well as sampling of spores and other airborne particles. Gregory was a leading expert on aerobiology related to fungal spores, but he also did important research on "dermatophytes, flowering bulbs, the spread of potato viruses, human allergy and cocoa diseases".

London University awarded Gregory the D.Sc. degree in 1949. In 1962 he was elected a Fellow of the Royal Society. He was the president of the Hertfordshire Natural History Society in 1966. Gregory gave the Royal Society's Leeuwenhoek Lecture in 1970 and the British Mycological Society's inaugural Benefactors' Lecture in 1984.
He died in 1986; he was married and had a son, a daughter, and three grandchildren.

Selected publications

Articles
 
 
 
 
 
 
 
 
   (pamphlet, 16 pages, illustrated)

Books

References

External links
 
  (publication list)

1907 births
1986 deaths
British mycologists
British phytopathologists
Alumni of Imperial College London
Rothamsted Experimental Station people
Academics of Imperial College London
Fellows of the Royal Society
People from Exmouth